

The Vabamu or Vabamu Museum of Occupations and Freedom in Tallinn, Estonia, is located at the corner of Toompea St. and Kaarli Blvd. It was opened on July 1, 2003, and is dedicated to the 1940-1991 period in the history of Estonia, when the country was occupied by the Soviet Union, then Nazi Germany, and then again by the Soviet Union. During most of this time the country was known as the Estonian Soviet Socialist Republic.

The museum is managed by the Kistler-Ritso Estonian Foundation. The foundation is named after Olga Kistler-Ritso, the founder, president, and financial supporter of the foundation. The members of the foundation started to collect articles for the museum and for historical study in 1999. Cooperation was set with  Estonian International Commission for the Investigation of the Crimes Against Humanity, the Estonian State Commission on Examination of the Policies of Repression, Memento Association, the Research Centre of the Soviet Era in Estonia, as well as with the Russian Memorial Society dedicated to victims of Soviet repressions, and other organizations.

Gallery

See also
Museum of the Occupation of Latvia

References

External links

 

Museums in Tallinn
History museums in Estonia
Museum of Occupations
Museums established in 2003
2003 establishments in Estonia
Museum of Occupations
Cold War museums